Huaroncocha (possibly from Quechua waru basket or platform of a rope bridge to cross rivers / stony ground or place, precious stones, heaping, stone heap, -n a suffix, qucha lake,) is a lake in Peru located in the Pasco Region, Pasco Province, Huayllay District. Huaroncocha lies north of Huascacocha.

The western part of the lake is also called Huaroncocha Chico (Spanish for "small") and the eastern part is named Yanamachay (possibly from Quechua for "black cave").

See also
 Huayllay National Sanctuary
List of lakes in Peru

References

INEI, Compendio Estadistica 2007, page 26

Lakes of Peru
Lakes of Pasco Region